Trafalgar Site, RI-639 is a prehistoric archaeological site in Warwick, Rhode Island.  The site's primary component is a shell midden.  Finds at the site include stone tools, bone, and tools for working bone.

The site was listed on the National Register of Historic Places in 1983.

See also
National Register of Historic Places listings in Kent County, Rhode Island

References

Warwick, Rhode Island
National Register of Historic Places in Kent County, Rhode Island
Archaeological sites on the National Register of Historic Places in Rhode Island